Taking into account the definition of a crown group, crown eukaryotes could be seen as the aggrupation of all lineages descending from LECA (Last Eukarytotic Common Ancestor). This comprises a huge ensemble of taxa that seemingly diverged simultaneously and that conform the vast majority of the eukaryotic life, plants, fungi, animals and the variety of protist lineages. According to ribosomal RNA data, the radiation of eukaryotes from LECA would have originated from a series of basal lineages that branched off successively at this early stage. The hallmark of these organisms pertaining to crown eukaryotes is a higher complexity of their genetic and cellular machinery as compared with prokaryotes, enabled by their cellular compartmentalization. This complexity is accompanied by others extra cell-morphological features: endo/exocytosis, sexual reproduction, multicellularity, and vertical inheritance (as opposed to the horizontal gene transfer common among prokaryotes), that have led to the current morphological, behavioral and macroecological complexity of eukaryotes

If regarded as a crown group, the different lineages of eukaryotic organisms could be traced back until a most recent common ancestor, here LECA. However, the determination of when and how the first crown-group eukaryotes arose remains as one of the main questions of evolutionary biology. LECA seems to lie between Excavata and Neozoa. However, the origin of eukaryotes can be traced back to stages prior to the formation of LECA. The current scientific consensus agrees that eukaryotic organisms originated from within the Archaea, in particular, from clades close to TACK archaea (Thaumarchaeota, Aigarchaeota, Crenarchaeota, and Korarchaeota). As such, if Eukarya descend from Archaea, this last group becomes paraphyletic and offers the possible identification of FECA (First Eukaryotic Common Ancestor),i.e. the oldest branching point at which the eukaryote lineage and its closest extant relatives separated. Therefore, the evolutionary process that led to the origin of the crown-group eukaryotes (eukaryogenesis) would consist in the transition from FECA to LECA via the acquisition of the eukaryotic traits.

When dealing with this process, stem eukaryotic groups must be differentiated from proper crown eukaryotic groups. Stem eukaryotic groups would have appeared during the long process of acquisition of the eukaryotic traits but went extinct. The problematic then arises for the identification of the first, given that taphonomic loss and inaccuracy of molecular clocks has led to huge phylogenetic gap comprising the intermediate states that would conform the stem eukaryotes.

Notwithstanding, ideas can be postulated regarding the eukaryotic organism formation based on the traits found in archaeal and α-proteobacteria common to eukaryotes. This consists mostly in homologues of eukaryotic molecular features, specially those related with cytoskeleton, cytokines and membrane remodeling systems. Indeed, these features are more abundant in the TACK Archaea. This suggests that the acquisition of mitochondria was not the onset event, but that rather there had been prior to that an important acquisition of rudimentary eukaryotic traits in the early eukaryotic stem groups. Loss of cell wall and formation of membrane-lined compartments are the kind of things that we might expect occurring in the eukaryotic stem groups. In the same way, mitochondrial acquisition must not be regarded as the end of the process, for still new complex families of genes had to be developed after or during the endosymbiotic exchange. In this way, from FECA to LECA, we can think of organisms that can be considered as protoeukaryotes. At the end of the process, LECA was already a complex organism with the presence of protein families involved in cellular compartmentalization.

Elucidation of this problem from paleontological record is hindered due to taphonomic loss of biomarkers and the small likelihood that cells without walls or other coverings fossilize. This taphonomic barrier blurs our view of the FECA-LECA transition. The recognition of early eukaryotes lies on general eukaryotic features: larger size, morphological complexity and multicellularity. In this sense, the most common fossils clearly assigned to eukaryotes are to acanthomorphic acritarchs, ornate carbonaceous vesicles with no taxonomic affiliation. The oldest  of these fossils that can be assigned to eukaryotes date back to the late Palaeoproterozoic in the acritarchs Tappania and Shuiyousphaeridium. Findings of other fossils exhibiting structural complexity, albeit not taxonomically resolved, consolidate the fact of pre-Ediacaran eukaryotic life. The oldest unambiguous crown eukaryote is dated in the late Mesoproterozoic and is the Bangiomorpha, which can be recognized as a red algae.

In this way, at the origin of crown eukaryotes, we find a situation in which even if we can identify early eukaryotic forms, most cannot be affiliated to any lineage, which leaves also unresolved the post-LECA stages of the origin of crown-eukaryotes.

Of notice, some authors suggest that the view of eukaryotes as  a crown group is obsolete, and instead suggest that fungi, plants and animals evolved independently from different unicellular ancestors.

See also 

 Evolutionary biology

References

External links 
Habitatual Information

Phylogenetics
Biological classification
Evolutionary biology